William Evan Crawford Allan (24 July 1899 – 18 October 2005) was, at the age of 106, one of Australia's last living veterans of the First World War, and the last remaining Australian who saw active service in both world wars. Allan was a career sailor in the Royal Australian Navy (RAN), serving from 1914 to 1947.

Early life
Allan was born in Bega in the then British colony of New South Wales, eighteen months before the Commonwealth of Australia came into being.

Naval career
He joined the RAN in March 1914 at the age of fourteen as an ordinary seaman second class. When war was declared on 14 August 1914, he was 15 and serving aboard the training ship , which was docked in Rose Bay, Sydney. He served on board  until the end of the war, and became an able seaman in 1915. When he was eighteen, he survived the Spanish flu pandemic, which killed over fifty of his shipmates on a transport voyage between Cape Town and Sierra Leone.

Between the world wars, Allan almost drowned after falling overboard in the North Atlantic — and would have done so had his captain not braved the precipitous storm, turned the ship around, and rescued him with the help of a life preserver and a rope ladder. In 1932 he was promoted to chief petty officer.

He retired from the Navy on 30 October 1947, after serving thirty-four years, being granted his war service rank of lieutenant prior to discharge.

He met his wife, Ita Blakely, while his ship was docked in Vancouver, British Columbia, Canada, in 1924, and he continued to write to her until his ship returned to Vancouver in 1941. They married on that return trip and sailed to Australia as newlyweds on SS Mariposa via Hawaii — only twelve days before the Japanese attacked Pearl Harbor.

Later life
Allan was awarded the 80th Anniversary Armistice Remembrance Medal by the Government of Australia in 1999, and lived in the Melbourne suburb of Essendon, Victoria until his death at the age of 106.

References

External links
 Interview with W. E. Allan
 Navy News report of his death and funeral
 Daily Telegraph (British newspaper) obituary

1899 births
2005 deaths
Australian centenarians
Australian military personnel of World War I
Men centenarians
Royal Australian Navy personnel of World War II
Royal Australian Navy sailors
Royal Australian Navy officers
Military personnel from New South Wales